Claude Audran the Younger (1639–1684), the second son of Claude I, was born at Lyons. He studied drawing with his uncle Charles in Paris, and subsequently went to Rome. On his return he was engaged by Le Brun at Paris, and assisted him in his pictures of the 'Passage of the Granicus,' the 'Battle of Arbela,' and in many other of his works; and was an imitator of his style. He painted also in fresco, under the direction of Le Brun, the chapel of Colbert's Château at Sceaux, the gallery of the Tuileries, the grand staircase at the Palace of Versailles, and other works. He drew well, and had great facility of execution. He died in Paris in 1684.

References

 

1639 births
1684 deaths
17th-century French engravers
Engravers from Lyon
Fresco painters